Crataegus cupulifera is a hawthorn. The name is considered to be a synonym of C. scabrida var. egglestoni.

References

cupulifera